Andria Bitadze (Georgian: ანდრია ბითაძე; born 17 May 1997) is a professional Georgian water polo player for WPC Dinamo Tbilisi and the Georgian national team. Previously he has played for Jadran Herceg Novi, CN Barcelona, VK Crvena Zvezda and Roma vis Nova.

He participated at the 2018 Men's European Water Polo Championship.

Club career 
Andria started his youth career in Tbilisi, Georgia at the club Iveria which has become his first junior team. Shortly after winning Georgian championship for several times, he was selected for the junior Georgian national team.

Soon the young talented player continued his career: First in Jadran Herceg Novi where he competed in the senior squad coached by famous Montenegrin water polo player Vladimir Gojković who is currently the coach of the Montenegro men's national water polo team. Second foreign team for the Georgian was CN Barcelona (40 Spanish Championship titles, 19 Spanish League titles), playing División de Honor de Waterpolo, coached by famous Spanish water polo player and coach Toni Esteller.

After clinching the 6th place with CN Barcelona in the national championship, Bitadze continued his career in Rome, becoming the youngest foreign player in Serie A1 for the 2016/2017 season, scoring 9 goals. In the end of the season Roma Vis Nova lost play-out matches and the team was relegated in Serie A2.

For the 2017/2018 season Andria remained in Roma Vis Nova (coach Alessandro Calcaterra) as the only foreign player in the team scoring 18 goals and clinching the 7th place in the championship.

In September 2018 he signed a new contract with a Serbian giant VK Crvena zvezda, the team coached by a legendary player and one of the best coaches in water polo history Dejan Savić, where he was a runner-up of Serbian water polo national championship.

LEN announced a list of clubs which got wild cards for the 2018/19 Champions League Preliminary round. One of the teams is Crvena Zvezda, this will be the debut for the current format of the championship. VK Crvena zvezda won their first and only title in 2012/2013 LEN Champions League season.

After a successful season at VK Crvena zvezda, he returned in Tbilisi to join WPC Dinamo Tbilisi, which will compete in group stage of the LEN Champions League. It is first time in his career, that he will be playing for a native club.

International career 
The first selection for the youngster was in 2009 for junior Georgian national team coached by Montenegrin water polo player Jovan Popović. In 2013 Georgia qualified for the LEN Junior Water Polo European U17 Championship held in Malta, Valletta. Next was LEN European U19 Water Polo Championship which was held in capital of Georgia, Tbilisi.

In 2017, Netherlands, Alphen aan den Rijn held the U19 junior European Championship, which came out to be the final one for him.

The debut match for the Senior national team of Georgia took place in Tbilisi on the international LEN tournament against Ukraine. Andria has scored 2 goals in his international debut gaining first victory on the tournament for Georgia.

By far, Georgia men's national water polo team has qualified for three LEN European Aquatics Championships (2014; 2016; 2018) Bitadze's first major tournament was 2016 Men's European Water Polo Championship (coached by Jovan Popović) taking place in Belgrade, Serbia.

He also took part in 2018 Men's European Water Polo Championship held in Spain, Barcelona (coached by Revaz Chomakhidze)

By far he has competed in two European championships.

LEN European Junior Water Polo Championship, 2013, Malta, Valletta - 13th Place
LEN European Junior Water Polo Championship, 2014, Georgia, Tbilisi - 16th Place
LEN European U19 Water Polo Championship, 2016 - 10th Place
2016 Men's European Water Polo Championship, Serbia, Belgrade - 14th Place
2018 Men's European Water Polo Championship, Spain, Barcelona - 13th Place

References

1997 births
Living people
Male water polo players from Georgia (country)
Expatriate water polo players
Expatriate sportspeople from Georgia (country) in Italy